Stephen Lugor (born 1967) is a Sudanese sprinter. He competed in the men's 400 metres at the 1992 Summer Olympics.

References

1967 births
Living people
Athletes (track and field) at the 1992 Summer Olympics
Sudanese male sprinters
Olympic athletes of Sudan
World Athletics Championships athletes for Sudan
Place of birth missing (living people)